Choi U-geun (18 September 1926 – 20 September 2022) was a South Korean businessman and military politician.

Choi died on 20 September 2022, at the age of 96.

References

1926 births
2022 deaths
South Korean businesspeople
Kyungbock High School alumni
Korea Military Academy alumni
Members of the National Assembly (South Korea)
South Korean military personnel of the Korean War
Korean military personnel of the Vietnam War
People from Gangneung
Gangneung Choe clan
20th-century South Korean politicians